The Building Centre is a building in central London used to promote innovation in the built environment. It is run by the Built Environment Trust, a charitable body.

Formation
The centre was founded in 1931 starting as the building materials bureau of the Architectural Association. Its first managing director was Frank Yerbury, architectural photographer and secretary of the Architectural Association School, and its first chairman was Maurice Webb. It opened its doors on 7 September 1932 at 158 New Bond Street

Locations
The Building Centre operated from New Bond Street until its building was destroyed during The Blitz on 12 May 1941. As a result, it moved to Conduit Street and was based there until 1951, when it moved to its present home in Store Street. The building had been designed by the modernist architects Taperell and Haase as a Daimler motor showroom. It is built of reinforced concrete, faced with Portland stone. When converted to the Building Centre, a sgraffito mural by Augustus Lunn was installed in the open-air courtyard and patio, although this has since been hidden or lost.

Notable people
Sir Giles Gilbert Scott, President from 1940 - 1959
Sir Basil Spence, President from 1960 - 1968
Sir Frederick Gibberd, President in 1969
Sir Alfred Hurst, Chairman from 1940 - 1962

Organisations at the Building Centre
Organisations located at the building include: the Built Environment Trust, the Construction Industry Council, the Construction Products Association, and the UK Green Building Council.

Current services
Admission to the galleries on the ground floor and lower ground floor is free. There is a cafe open to the public and conference facilities available for hire and are used for a variety of events.

Early key exhibitions
1933 - Three-bedroom cottages competition 
1936 - Inn Signs Exhibition
1936 - Women in Architecture
1940 - Railings for Scrap

References

External links
 The Building Centre - official site

1932 establishments in the United Kingdom
Museums in the London Borough of Camden
Architecture museums in the United Kingdom